Ramazan Bashardost (born 1961) was former planning minister in Afghanistan and a current member of the National Assembly of Afghanistan. He was an independent candidate in the 2009 Afghan presidential election.

Early life and education 
Ramzan Bashardost was born in Qarabagh District, Ghazni Province of Afghanistan in a family of a respected government employees, he is fluent in Persian and Pashto. He completed his primary and intermediate education in Qarabagh and later in Maimana, capital of Fariyab in northern Afghanistan. Months after the 1978 coup d'état, Bashardost left Afghanistan for Iran. He finished high school in Iran and then immigrated into Pakistan.

In 1983, he left Pakistan for France, where he spent more than 20 years, earning degrees in law and political science. In 1989 he enrolled at Grenoble University, where he did his master's in law. In 1990, he did his master's in diplomacy from Paris University. In 1992, he did his master's in political science. In 1995, Bashardost received his Ph.D. in law from France's Toulouse University. He wrote his thesis on the UN's role against the Soviet invasion of Afghanistan.

Career 
After years in exile, Bashardost returned to Afghanistan in 2002 to work in the UN Department of Afghanistan's Foreign Affairs Ministry. In 2003, he was appointed as director of European and Western Political Affairs Department in the ministry. In March 2004, he was appointed minister of planning but resigned that December in protest at the government's alleged inability to take action over 2,000 Afghan and international non governmental organisations (NGOs) outlawed by his ministry in Afghanistan.

In 2004 Bashardost published his book, Basic Political, Military and Diplomatic Laws of Afghanistan – from the era of Ahmad Shah Baba (1225 Hejri) to current years, in which he presented his analysis of the history of laws in Afghanistan. The book won an award at the Academy of Political Sciences of France, the first award won by an independent Afghan scientist and scholar.

Bashardost has no affiliations with any tribal, military or political party. He is in an independent scholar and political activist, well known for his support and defense of human rights. He is well known as a prominent voice against the corrupt Afghan authorities of the past three decades, and a bold reformer and critic of the government.

In 2004/05 he briefly served as Afghanistan's planning minister. He was critical of the role played by NGOs and claimed that majority of them were a source of Afghanistan money drain. He particularly highlighted the hefty amounts paid to the NGO employees and ministers as compared to the average income of less than a dollar average national income. Controversy surrounded his stance, and he had to resign under government and foreign pressure. However, his outspoken criticism of the government and his firm stances against corruption and for public welfare won him widespread support.

In 2006 he was elected as Kabul's representative in the parliamentary elections. He won the third highest number of votes, which spanned across ethnic and linguistic groups.

in 2010 RFE/RL's Radio has selected him as the Person Of The Year and the Afghanistan' Gandhi.

Presidential election 2009 
Bashardost registered for the presidential election on 7 May 2009. 
His first VP is agriculture institute professor Mohammad Mosa Barekzai, and the second VP is Afifa Maroof, who works in the Afghan Independent Human Rights Commission. A white dove, the symbol of peace, is Bashardost's emblem for the election.
Preliminary results placed him 3rd in a field of 38. In the provinces Ghazni and Daykundi he beat the two main candidates Karzai and Abdullah.

Bashardost is mostly known for his strong rejection of corruption. "In the Afghan administration now, money is the law (...). Afghanistan is the only country in the world where corruption is legal". Because of his sometimes offbeat stance and style, he has been nicked as a"popular Don Quixote and a maverick.

Literature 
Basic Political, Military and Diplomatic Laws of Afghanistan, written and published in 2004.

References

External links 
True Afghan Eyes Interview with Dr. Bashardost
Afghan Elections Dossier - Ramazan Bashardost, August 2009 - Radio France Internationale
Interview with Radio France Internationale in English, August 2009

Planning ministers of Afghanistan
Members of the House of the People (Afghanistan)
1961 births
Living people
Hazara politicians
People from Ghazni Province
Afghan expatriates in France
Paris 2 Panthéon-Assas University alumni
Toulouse 1 University Capitole alumni
2000s in Afghanistan
2010s in Afghanistan
21st-century Afghan politicians